Rhammatophyllum pachyrhizum is a plant species native to Kazakhstan and Kyrgyzstan.

Rhammatophyllum pachyrhizum is a subshrub up to 30 cm (12 in) tall. Its leaves are narrow and thread-like, growing up to 7 cm (3 in) long, but only 0.5 (0.02 in) mm wide. Its flowers are creamy white.

References

Brassicaceae
Flora of Kazakhstan
Flora of Kyrgyzstan